Gennaria diphylla is a species of flowering plant from the orchid family, Orchidaceae, native to the region from the western Mediterranean and Macaronesia (Canary Islands, Madeira, Portugal, Spain, the Balearic Islands, Morocco, Algeria, Tunisia, Sardinia, Tuscany). Gennaria diphylla was illustrated (as Habenaria cordata) in plate 3164 of Curtis' Botanical Magazine, 1832.

Description
Gennaria diphylla has a stem about 15–30 cm tall. The stem bears two leaves. The lower leaf is larger, 4–7 cm long and 2.5–7 cm wide. The upper leaf is considerably smaller. Both leaves are elliptical or ovate in shape, with rounded lobes at the base making it heart-shaped. The flowers are borne in a spike up to 10 cm long. They are yellowish-green and form a bell-like shape. The lip (labellum) has three lobes, the middle one being slightly longer. A spur is present.

Taxonomy
Gennaria diphylla was first described, as Satyrium diphyllum, by Johann Link in 1799. Filippo Parlatore transferred the species to his newly created genus Gennaria in 1860. The genus name honours Patrizio Gennari. The specific epithet diphylla means "two-leaved".

References

Pridgeon, A.M., Cribb, P.J., Chase, M.A. & Rasmussen, F. eds. (2001). Genera Orchidacearum 2. Oxford Univ. Press.
Berg Pana, H. (2005). Handbuch der Orchideen-Namen. Dictionary of Orchid Names. Dizionario dei nomi delle orchidee. Ulmer, Stuttgart

External links
 
 

Flora of Macaronesia
Flora of North Africa
Orchids of Europe
Orchideae